Tactical recognition flash (TRF) is the British military term for a coloured patch worn on the right arm of combat clothing by members of the British Army, Royal Navy and Royal Air Force. A TRF serves to quickly identify the regiment or corps of the wearer, in the absence of a cap badge. It is similar to, but distinct from, the DZ Flashes worn by members of Airborne Forces.

TRFs should not be confused with formation signs or insignia, which are used to denote the formation (usually brigade or division or a higher headquarters) and are worn in addition to TRFs by a member of any regiment or corps serving in that formation.

Army

Royal Armoured Corps

Army Air Corps

Infantry

Adjutant General's Corps

Colonial Forces

Historic

Royal Air Force

Cadet Forces 
Tactical Recognition Flashes are not to be worn by Cadet Force Adult Volunteers (CFAVs) or cadets of the Army Cadet Force and army section of the Combined Cadet Force irrespective of any affiliation to a Corps or Regiment. Cadets and CFAVs do wear county and contingent flashes of the Army Cadet Force and Combined Cadet Force respectively. Officers of the Air Training Corps and the RAF Section of the Combined Cadet Force wear the RAF tactical recognition flash, Adult Warrant Officers and Senior Non-Commissioned Officers wear the RAFAC Staff formation flash, and cadets wear RAFAC Cadet formation flash.

See also 
 Unit Colour Patch - Australian equivalent
 Shoulder sleeve insignia - American similar equivalent
 Drop zone flash

References 

British military uniforms
British military insignia